The Ecclesiastical Architecture of Scotland from the Earliest Christian Times to the Seventeenth Century is a book that was published in 3 volumes in 1896-1897 by Scottish architects David MacGibbon and Thomas Ross.

The book has the same premise as The Castellated and Domestic Architecture of Scotland except with ecclesiastical buildings such as churches, chapels and cathedrals instead of castles.

Gallery

References

1896 non-fiction books
19th century in Scotland
British travel books
Books about Scotland
1890s in Edinburgh